Gastrocopta is a genus of minute air-breathing land snails, terrestrial pulmonate gastropod mollusks or micromollusks in the family Gastrocoptidae.

Gastrocopta is the type genus of the subfamily Gastrocoptinae. The height of the shell is about 2 mm.

Distribution 
The Recent distribution of Gastrocopta includes North America, eastern Asia, central Asia and South America (Brazil and Venezuela).

In Europe, the genus Gastrocopta has been extirpated; its fossils there are known mainly from the Neogene, but its fossil range in Europe is from the Oligocene to the Lower Pleistocene.

List of synonyms
 Australbinula Pilsbry, 1916
 Bifidaria Sterki, 1891
 Eubifidaria Sterki, 1893
 Falsopupa Germain, 1918
 Gastrocopta (Albinula) Sterki, 1892· accepted, alternate representation
 Gastrocopta (Ameralbinula) Pierce in Pierce & Rasmussen, 1992 †· accepted, alternate representation
 Gastrocopta (Australbinula) Pilsbry, 1916· accepted, alternate representation
 Gastrocopta (Gastrocopta) Wollaston, 1878· accepted, alternate representation
 Gastrocopta (Geminidens) Pilsbry, 1930· accepted, alternate representation
 Gastrocopta (Immersidens) Pilsbry & Vanatta, 1900· accepted, alternate representation
 Gastrocopta (Privatula) Sterki, 1893· accepted, alternate representation
 Gastrocopta (Sinalbinula) Pilsbry, 1916· accepted, alternate representation
 Gastrocopta (Staurotrema) Pilsbry, 1948· accepted, alternate representation
 Gastrocopta (Vertigopsis) Sterki, 1892· accepted, alternate representation
 Gyrodaria Iredale, 1940
 Leucochilus O. Boettger, 1881 (Invalid: Leucochilus was originally an unjustified emendation of Leucochila Martens, 1860, but had been used as a separate name until it was placed on the Official Index by Opinion 115, 1931; junior synonym)
 Pupa (Bifidaria) Sterki, 1891· accepted, alternate representation
 Pupa (Leucochilus) O. Boettger, 1881 (Invalid: Leucochilus was originally an unjustified emendation of Leucochila Martens, 1860, but had been used as a separate name until it was placed on the Official Index by Opinion 115, 1931; junior synonym)

Species 
Species within the genus Gastrocopta include:

 † Gastrocopta abyssifluminis Roth, 1999 
 † Gastrocopta acuminata (Klein, 1846) 
 † Gastrocopta akokala Pierce in Pierce & Constenius, 2001 
  Gastrocopta allyni Roth & Christensen, 1984
 Gastrocopta armifera (Say, 1821)
 Gastrocopta ashmuni (Chamberlin & Berry, 1930) - sluice snaggletooth
 Gastrocopta avanica (Benson, 1863)
 Gastrocopta bannertonensis (Gabriel, 1930) 
 Gastrocopta barbadensis (Pfeiffer, 1853)
 Gastrocopta boninensis Pilsbry, 1916
 † Gastrocopta borysthaenica Prysjazhnjuk, 2015 
 † Gastrocopta bugensis Prysjazhnjuk in Gozhik & Prysjazhnjuk, 1978 
 † Gastrocopta chichijimana Pilsbry, 1916
 Gastrocopta cochisensis (Pilsbry & Ferriss, 1910)
 † Gastrocopta conica Pierce in Pierce & Rasmussen, 1992 
 Gastrocopta contracta (Say, 1822)
 † Gastrocopta cordillerae Roth, 1986 
 Gastrocopta corticaria (Say, 1816)
 Gastrocopta cristata Pilsbry & Vanatta
 Gastrocopta dalliana (Sterki, 1898)
 Gastrocopta damarica (Ancey, 1888)
 † Gastrocopta dehmi Schlickum & Strauch, 1979
 † Gastrocopta devjatkini Prysjazhnjuk in Prysjazhnjuk et al., 1975
 † Gastrocopta didymodus (Sandberger, 1858) 
 Gastrocopta duplicata (Preston, 1911)
 † Gastrocopta edlaueri (Wenz, 1921)
 Gastrocopta ejecta (Bavay & Dautzenberg, 1912)
 Gastrocopta eudeli Pilsbry, 1916
 Gastrocopta ferdinandi (Andreae, 1902)
 † Gastrocopta fissidens (Sandberger, 1858)
 Gastrocopta geminidens (Pilsbry)
 Gastrocopta gularis F. G. Thompson & López, 1996
  Gastrocopta hedleyi Pilsbry, 1917
 Gastrocopta iheringi (Suter, 1900)
 † Gastrocopta itaboraiensis Salvador & Simone, 2013 
 † Gastrocopta kazachica Steklov in Steklov & Tsytovich, 1967 
 † Gastrocopta kedeica Prysiazhniuk, 2017 †
 † Gastrocopta kintlana Pierce in Pierce & Constenius, 2001 †
 Gastrocopta klunzingeri (Jickeli, 1873)
 † Gastrocopta krestnikovi Steklov, 1967 
 † Gastrocopta lamellidens (F. Sandberger, 1858) 
 Gastrocopta larapinta (Tate, 1896)
 † Gastrocopta lartetii (Dupuy, 1850) 
 † Gastrocopta leonardi Pierce in Pierce & Rasmussen, 1992 
 Gastrocopta macdonnelli (Brazier, 1875)
 Gastrocopta margaretae (Cox, 1868)
 † Gastrocopta mezzalirai (Ferreira & Coelho, 1971) 
 Gastrocopta microscopica (E. von Martens, 1898)
 † Gastrocopta minuscula Pierce in Pierce & Rasmussen, 1992 
 † Gastrocopta mongolica Prysjazhnjuk in Prysjazhnjuk et al., 1975 
 † Gastrocopta montana Roth, 1986 
 † Gastrocopta moravica (Petrbok, 1959) 
 Gastrocopta mussoni Pilsbry, 1917
 † Gastrocopta nouletiana (Dupuy, 1850) 
 † Gastrocopta obesa Pierce in Pierce & Rasmussen, 1992 
 Gastrocopta oblonga (Pfeiffer, 1852)
 † Gastrocopta ogasawarana Pilsbry, 1916
 † [[Gastrocopta oviforma]] Pierce in Pierce & Rasmussen, 1992 
 † Gastrocopta patagonica Miquel & P. E. Rodriguez, 2016 
 Gastrocopta pediculus (Shuttleworth, 1852)
 Gastrocopta pellucida (Pfeiffer, 1840)
 Gastrocopta pentodon (Say, 1821)
 Gastrocopta pilsbryana (Pilsbry, 1948) - Montane snaggletooth
 † Gastrota polocopnica Harzhauser & Neubauer, 2018
 Gastrocopta procera (Gould)
 Gastrocopta prototypus (Pilsbry, 1899)
 † Gastrocopta pseudotheeli Steklov, 1966 
 † Gastrocopta quadriplicata (A. Braun in Walchner, 1851) 
 Gastrocopta recondita (Tapparone Canefri, 1883)
 † Gastrocopta rhenana Geissert, 1983 
 Gastrocopta riograndensis (Pilsbry & Vanatta, 1900)
 Gastrocopta rixfordi Hanna, 1923
 Gastrocopta rupicola
 Gastrocopta rupicola marginalba (Pfeiffer, 1840)
 † Gastrocopta russelli Pierce in Pierce & Rasmussen, 1992 
 † Gastrocopta sacraecoronae Krolopp, 1858
 Gastrocopta sagittaria Roth, 1986 †
 †Gastrocopta sandbergeri Stworzewicz & Prisyazhnyuk, 2006 
 † Gastrocopta serotina (Ložek, 1964)
 Gastrocopta servilis (Gould, 1843)
 † Gastrocopta shandgolica Prysjazhnjuk in Prysjazhnjuk et al., 1975 
 Gastrocopta sharae Salvador, Cavallari & Simone, 2017
  †Gastrocopta skiphica Prysjazhnjuk in Gozhik & Prysjazhnjuk, 1978
 Gastrocopta solitaria (Smith, 1890)
 † Gastrocopta steklovi Prisyazhnyuk, 1973 
 Gastrocopta strangei (Pfeiffer, 1854)
  Gastrocopta stupefaciens Pokryszko, 1996
 † Gastrocopta suevica (O. Boettger, 1889) 
 Gastrocopta tappaniana (C. B. Adams, 1841)
  † Gastrocopta tavennerensis Pierce in Pierce & Rasmussen, 1992 
 Gastrocopta theeli (Westerlund, 1877)
 Gastrocopta thomasseti Pilsbry, 1929
 † Gastrocopta turgida (Reuss in Reuss & Meyer, 1849) 
 † Gastrocopta tuvaense Steklov, 1967 
 † Gastrocopta valentini Stworzewicz, 2007 

subgenus Vertigopsis Sterki, 1892
 † Gastrocopta moravica (Petrbok, 1959)
 † Gastrocopta n. sp. from the Viernheim research borehole
Species brought into synonymy
 Gastrocopta soneri Chamberlin & Jones, 1929: synonym of Gastrocopta pilsbryana (Sterki, 1890)

References 

 Pierce, H.G.; Rasmussen, D.L. (1992). The nonmarine mollusks of the Late Oligocene-Early Miocene Cabbage Patch fauna of western Montana. I. Geologic setting and the family Pupillidae (Pulmonata: Stylommatophora). Journal of Paleontology. 66(1): 39-5
 Bank, R. (2017). Classification of the Recent terrestrial Gastropoda of the World. Last update: July 16, 2017

External links 
 

Vertiginidae
Taxonomy articles created by Polbot